Pituffik is a former settlement in northern Greenland, located at the eastern end of Bylot Sound by a tombolo known as Uummannaq, near the current site of the American Thule Air Base. The former inhabitants were relocated to the present-day town of Qaanaaq. The relocation and the fallout from the 1968 Thule Air Base B-52 crash in the vicinity are a contentious issue in Greenland's relations with Denmark and the United States.

Exploration
Pituffik was a hunting village of the Greenlandic Inuit. The Qaanaaq region of northern Greenland in which it is located was inhabited for several thousand years, first settled 4,500 years ago by the Paleo-Eskimo peoples migrating from the Canadian Arctic.

The area was explored by Commander James Saunders of the Royal Navy while wintering on HMS North Star in 1849-50 after being trapped by the ice in the sound.

Military control

Forced relocation
In 1951 the United States was given permission to build Thule Air Base at the site of the settlement. The total cost of the relocation amounted to 8.65 million Danish krone (DKK), or 1.52 million US dollars, with more than half covered by the American side.

The airbase is not part of any civilian municipality of Greenland, but an enclave within Greenland, outside of its jurisdiction. Within Greenland the airbase location, and the airbase itself, continue to be referred to as Pituffik, in memory of the old settlement. Access to the site is restricted, with travellers bound for Thule Air Base required to apply for access permit from either Rigsombudsmanden in Nuuk (residents of Greenland), or the Danish Foreign Ministry (all others). Failure to present the permit during check-in results in denial of boarding. The same rules apply for transfers at Pituffik, including a stopover on the way from Qaanaaq to Savissivik, the southernmost settlement of northern Greenland, on the shore of Melville Bay.

Plutonium contamination 

Radioactive plutonium from the 1968 bomber crash contaminated the nearby ancient hunting grounds, affecting the livelihoods of the region's inhabitants. There is evidence of hairless fur seals, and muskoxen with deformed hooves; the pollution remaining a contentious issue between Greenland, Denmark, and the United States.

Legal action over civilian relocations 
While the protection of Greenland offered by the airbase is not disputed, the relocation of the 1950s remains a controversial issue in Greenland more than half a century later, with ongoing demands for land reclamation being proposed by Greenlandic politicians. The current Government of Greenland does not have influence over the continued existence of the airbase at the site, as foreign policy remains as prerogative of the Government of Denmark. From mid-1980s onwards the then Greenland Home Rule government worked together with the Government of Denmark to resolve the social effects of the eviction. On  30 September 1986 Denmark and the U.S agreed to reduce the area outside Greenland's jurisdiction to half of the original size. In 1997 the Danish government agreed to subsidize the construction of the Qaanaaq Airport (47 million DKK), in agreement with the Home Rule government.

On 28 November 2003 the Danish Supreme Court ruled on the relocation issue denying the residents of Qaanaaq the right to return to the former village in Pituffik. The Greenlanders, numbering 428 in the case, were represented by the Hingitaq 53 group. That decision was later appealed in the European Court of Human Rights. The Court unanimously declared the application inadmissible.

Internal debate in Greenland also concerned demands to force the airbase to pay lease fees for its use of the land.

The National Space Institute at the Technical University of Denmark operates the Thule Research Station at Pituffik, which is crewed up to two months a year.

Climate

See also
 High Arctic relocation
 Diego Garcia, the civilian population was removed in the 1970s to create a US Airforce Base in this British Indian Ocean Territory atoll

References 

Former populated places in Greenland